Chkalovka is a village in the Sevan Municipality of the Gegharkunik Province of Armenia.

Etymology 
The village was known as Aleksandrovka and Zeynalagali until 1946.

History 
The village was founded by Russians who emigrated from the Volga, Saratov and Tambov regions of the Russian Empire in the first half of the 19th century. On April 26, 1946, it was renamed in honour of test pilot Valeri Chkalov. Until 1926 it was inhabited by Russians. In 1831 it had 45 inhabitants, while in 1989 - 455 inhabitants.

Gallery

References

External links 
 
 

Populated places in Gegharkunik Province
Populated places established in 1840